Prostanthera junonis, commonly known as  Somersby mintbush, is a species of flowering plant in the family Lamiaceae and is endemic to the Central Coast of New South Wales. It is a low, straggling shrub with hairy, egg-shaped leaves and purple to mauve flowers.

Description
The sepals are usually slightly hairy and enlarge slightly by the fruiting stage. Flowering mainly occurs from October to February.

Taxonomy
Prostanthera junonis was first formally described in 1997 by Barry Conn in the journal Telopea from material collected near Somersby in 1993. The Binomial nomenclature (junonis) honours Mrs June Gay.

Distribution and habitat
Somersby mintbush grows in sclerophyll forest and woodland in sandy loamy soils on sandstone, in the Mangrove Mountain and Sydney districts on the Central Coast of New South Wales.

Conservation status
This mintbush is classified as "endangered" under the Australian Government Environment Protection and Biodiversity Conservation Act 1999 and the New South Wales Government Biodiversity Conservation Act 2016 and a recovery plant has been prepared. The main threats to the species include habitat loss and degradation due to agriculture, hazard reduction burns, weed invasion, and stormwater runoff.

References

External links

junonis
Flora of New South Wales
Lamiales of Australia
Plants described in 1997
Taxa named by Barry John Conn